Club Deportivo Mineros de Zacatecas is a Mexican football club from Zacatecas that compete in the Mexican Liga de Expansión MX. They are currently managed by Omar Alexis Moreno.

History
In December 2012, Grupo Pachuca purchased the Estudiantes Tecos franchise as they were relegated to the Ascenso MX. The team failed to gain promotion when they lost in penalties to Leones Negros de la U. de G. It was then that Grupo Pachuca decided to move the franchise from Zapopan to Zacatecas so as to not have four teams in Guadalajara. The city of Zacatecas had spent 11 years without an Ascenso team, since Real Sociedad de Zacatecas which were sold to Altamira in the summer of 2003.

The club's name was chosen to be Mineros (Miners) as the city of Zacatecas owes its existence to the discovering of silver mines in the late 16th century. The state of Zacatecas is one of the top producers of gold and silver in the world.

Los Mineros were in their first season of professional soccer, taking 2nd place in the Ascenso MX, yet were left out of the semifinals by its rival Necaxa. The team demonstrated their immediate competitiveness, as in 2014, Gustavo Adrián Ramírez scored the fastest goal in league history (four seconds) against rivals Necaxa to open the season.

In Clausura 2016, Mineros obtained their best achievement so far, in that tournament they reached the final of the tournament, in this series they were defeated against Necaxa by an aggregate of 0–2.

In June 2020 Grupo Pachuca sold the club to local businessman Eduardo López Muñoz, this due to the intentions of the conglomerate to have less teams under its ownership. With the new owner, most of the previously created structures were maintained, the new board was headed by López Muñoz, appointing Marco Iván Pérez as sports director and Omar Alexis Moreno as coach.

Stadium
The Estadio Carlos Vega Villalba has a capacity of 20,068 and is located in the city of Zacatecas. It was inaugurated in 1986 with a friendly match between the Leones Negros de la U. de G. vs. South Korea national football team.

Personnel

Management

Coaching staff

Players

Current squad

Out on loan

Reserve teams
Mineros de Fresnillo F.C.
Affiliate team that plays in the Liga Premier – Serie A, the third level of the Mexican league system.

Mineros de Zacatecas (Liga TDP)
Reserve team that plays in the Liga TDP, the fourth level of the Mexican league system.

Mineros Querétaro
Reserve team that plays in the Liga TDP, the fourth level of the Mexican league system.

Mineros Reynosa
Reserve team that plays in the Liga TDP, the fourth level of the Mexican league system.

Season to season

|}

Managers
 Pablo Marini (2014–15)
 Joel Sánchez (2015–16)
 Ricardo Rayas (2016–2017)
 Efraín Flores (2017)
 Andrés Carevic (2017–2019)
 Óscar Torres (2019–2020)
 Omar Alexis Moreno (2020–)

References

External links
  

 
Zacatecas City
Football clubs in Zacatecas